Ersatz is the debut album by French singer Julien Doré, winner of the fifth season of the television show Nouvelle Star. The album was released worldwide on 16 June 2008 on Sony BMG. It entered the French charts at number 2 and stayed in the top 200 for almost two years. Tracks 1 and 5 were written by Mark Daumail of Cocoon and featured Cocoon's other half, Morgan Imbeaud. The final track featured a duo with veteran Belgian rocker Arno.

Track listing

Singles released
"Les Limites" (2008)
"Figures Imposées" (2008)

References

2008 debut albums
Sony Music France albums
Julien Doré albums